NLRP8, short for NOD-like receptor family pyrin domain containing 8, is an intracellular protein that is expressed in the ovaries, testes, and preimplantation embryos of mammals.  It is also known as NALP8, NOD16, PAN4, and CLR19.2, and is one of 14 pyrin domain containing members of the NOD-like receptor family of cytoplasmic receptors.

References

Further reading

LRR proteins
NOD-like receptors